The United States Senior Curling Championships are the annual national curling championships for seniors in the United States. The United States Curling Association (USCA) defines seniors as adults over the age of 50. The champions go on to represent the United States at the World Senior Curling Championships. The USCA has held the Senior Championships since 2002, coinciding with the first year the World Senior Championships were held. Those first World Senior Championships were held in Bismarck, North Dakota and the American men won the gold medal.

The 2020 United States Senior Championships for both men and women were held in Fairbanks, Alaska from February 19 to 23, 2020.

Past champions

Men

Women

References

External links 

 United States Curling Association Senior National Championship page

United States National Curling Championships
Curling competitions in the United States
National championships in the United States
Recurring sporting events established in 2002
Senior curling